The Peanuts Movie: Snoopy's Grand Adventure is a side-scrolling platform video game based on The Peanuts Movie. The game launched on November 3, 2015 in North America, and November 6, 2015 in Europe and Australia for the Xbox 360 and most eighth-generation platforms, becoming the first Peanuts video game released on a Nintendo platform internationally since Snoopy Tennis in 2001.  It was distributed by Fox Digital Entertainment, published by Activision and developed by Behaviour Santiago.

Gameplay
The player plays as Snoopy and can play as Woodstock in co-op to help find Charlie Brown and his friends. In order to do this the player must go through several levels, each one ending at Snoopy's Doghouse.  Along the way the player will collect Jelly Beans, use various costumes, and find members of the Beagle Scouts. The player is able to customize Snoopy and Woodstock.

Story 
Charlie Brown and his friends play hide and seek in his backyard while unintentionally leaving a trail of jelly beans. Snoopy finds the trail and follows them in order to locate the gang.

Throughout the game, he goes through hiding spots the gang that the gang have hidden. However due to Snoopy’s crazy imagination, he believes them to be amazing and exciting places like the Amazon, space, Aztec temple, etc. he then finds Peppermint Patty, Linus, Lucy Van Pelt, Franklin, Pigpen, Schroeder and believing him to be the last kid standing. Charlie Brown believes he won, but unfortunately finds that The Little Red Haired Girl won instead as Charlie came out before she came out. Despite the fact he lost (again), he is happy that she smiled at him and congratulated him. Schroeder then plays the theme for the Peanuts and everybody dances.

Reception

The game received generally "mixed or average" reviews on Metacritic. At GameRankings the PS4 version holds a score of 65.00% while the Xbox One version holds a 63.56% score and the Wii U version has a score of 60.00%.

References

Video games based on Peanuts
2015 video games
20th Century Studios video games
Activision games
Blue Sky Studios video games
Nintendo 3DS eShop games
Nintendo 3DS games
PlayStation 4 games
Video games about dogs
Video games based on adaptations
Video games based on films
Video games developed in Chile
Video games with 2.5D graphics
Wii U eShop games
Wii U games
Xbox 360 games
Xbox One games